Astacoides hobbsi is a species of southern crawfish in the family Parastacidae.

The IUCN conservation status of Astacoides hobbsi is "VU", vulnerable. The species faces a high risk of endangerment in the medium term. The IUCN status was reviewed in 2016.

References

Further reading

 
 

Parastacidae
Articles created by Qbugbot
Crustaceans described in 2005